Baghdara is a village of Abbottabad District in Khyber Pakhtunkhwa province of Pakistan. It is located at 34°8'0N 73°5'0E with an altitude of 1017 metres (3339 feet). Neighbouring settlements include Patian, Bagwal Bandi and Chamhad Baba mulla mureed

References

Populated places in Abbottabad District